Pintada (International title: Painted Woman) is a Philippine romantic drama television series based on the PHR pocketbook Green Meadows created by Arielle and directed by Theodore C. Boborol, Cathy Garcia-Molina, and Toto Natividad. It also serves as the 17th installment of the Precious Hearts Romances Presents series. The series stars Denise Laurel as Alysa Alvarez and Martin del Rosario as Severino Monzon, with an ensemble cast consisting of Lemuel Pelayo, Alma Concepcion, Ricardo Cepeda, Nikka Valencia, Bernadette Allyson, Lorenzo Mara, Chase Vega, Trina Legaspi, Yen Santos, Eslove Briones, Deniesse Joaquin, Jommy Teotico, Jess Mendoza, James Reid, Erin Ocampo, Cecil Paz, Arlene Tobias, Lui Manansala, Dolly Gutierrez, Buddy Palad, and Boom Labrusca in their supporting roles. The series premiered on ABS-CBN's Kapamilya Gold afternoon block and worldwide on TFC from July 16 to November 2, 2012 replacing Precious Hearts Romances Presents: Hiyas and was replaced by Precious Hearts Romances Presents: Paraiso.

Synopsis
Precious Hearts Romances Presents Pintada is a love story between high school student Sev (Martin del Rosario) and his chemistry teacher, Lysa (Denise Laurel).

Lysa is a young woman with a beauty desired by men and envied by women. One day, a fire breaks out in the school she works in. While trying to rescue her students, a part of her face gets burned. She lost her beauty in that tragic fire which gave her a lifetime scar, physically and emotionally.

Some people died in the fire, and among them is Mr. Sandejas who is rumored to have had an affair with her. Besieged by hatred from the townsfolk and ashamed of her badly burned face, Lysa spends 6 years in prison. Lysa decides to leave and live in seclusion, but Noel brings her back to Cervantes to clear her name and take revenge on the people behind her suffering.

Cast and characters

Main cast
 Denise Laurel as Alysa "Lysa" Alvarez
 Martin del Rosario as Severino "Sev" Monzon
 Lemuel Pelayo as Noel Crisostomo

Supporting cast
 Alma Concepcion as Carolina Monzon
 Ricardo Cepeda as Alberto "Albert" Sandejas
 Nikka Valencia as Lorena Alvarez
 Bernadette Alison as Karen Sandejas
 Lorenzo Mara as Victor Dela Cruz
 Chase Vega as Taylor Alvarez
 Trina Legaspi as Isabel "Isay" Alvarez
 Yen Santos as Samantha Diño
 Eslove Briones as Dave Dela Cruz
 Deniesse Joaquin as Jing Briones
 Jommy Teotico as Edward Pascual
 Jess Mendoza as Arturo 'Atong' Policarpio
 James Reid as Vito
 Erin Ocampo as Trixie
 Cecil Paz as Girlie
 Arlene Tolibas as Princess
 Lui Manansala as Ms. Nolasco
 Dolly de Leon (credited as Dolly Gutierrez) as Paz
 Buddy Palad as Mang Tonying
 Boom Labrusca as Quintin

Guest cast
 Jairus Aquino as Bordy
 Simon Ibarra as Gardo
 Manuel Chua as Dante
 Mary Roldan as Mary 
 EJ Jallorina as Ramon 
 Beverly Salviejo as Minda 
 Menggie Cobarrubias as Melancio 
 Joseph Marco as Julian

Ratings
Precious Hearts Romances Presents Pintada belongs to the top 5 most watched programs in the Daytime and holds the number one place on its timeslot against its rival from other networks, according to Kantar Media-TNS.

Last August 17, 2012, based on the official survey results released by Kantar Media-TNS, Pintada got a rating of 12.3%; 13.7% on August 20; and on August 21, it soared higher garnering a rating of 16.0%. On the following days, however, ratings got by Pintada were not consistent and ranged from 12 to 16%.

Recently, Pintada recorded a rating of 16.4% on October 3, 2012, and 14.8% on October 4, 2012.

Besides the household surveyed ratings, Pintada also got positive remarks from critics. One blogger even said that he would highly recommend Pintada to anyone who cares because of its believable school-based story.

Trivia
 There were 67 crews behind the production of the series.
 According to the Internet Movie Database (IMDb), Pintada became 76% more popular in the last week of August compared to the previous weeks.
 Pintada, though not a primetime show, has already trended many times on the micro-blogging site Twitter. Some of the hashtags that have trended were "#Pintada1stWeek" - "#Pintada4thWeek", "#Pintada" and "#ExtendPintada"

Cast

Martin Del Rosario 
 Lead star Martin Del Rosario had his first lead role with Precious Hearts Romances Presents Pintada.
 Martin Del Rosario was discovered by his manager Jun Reyes when he saw Martin in front of Lourdes School of Quezon City in the summer of 2007 to buy Lechon for Gerald Anderson's birthday. His manager said that Martin's asset was his eyes which seem to be lethargic.

Denise Laurel 
 Denise Laurel was first seen on TV through the ABS-CBN's program "Ang TV 2."
 Denise Laurel also had roles in previous Precious Hearts Romances Series namely "Bud Brothers," "You're Mine, Only Mine," "Midnight Phantom," and "Kristine." On the contrary, it is the first time for her leading man Martin Del Rosario to have a role in a  Series.

Lemuel Pelayo 
 Pintada was the third project given to Lemuel Pelayo by ABS-CBN next to the Hiyas and Angelito.
 Lemuel Pelayo admitted that he knew that PHR Series contain daring scenes and that he was ready to spice-up Pintada.

See also
 Precious Hearts Romances Presents
 List of ABS-CBN drama series

References

External links
 

ABS-CBN drama series
2012 Philippine television series debuts
2012 Philippine television series endings
Philippine romance television series
Television shows based on books
Filipino-language television shows
Television shows filmed in the Philippines